This is a comprehensive list of awards and nominations won by American recording artist R. Kelly. His awards are predominantly in R&B and hip-hop genre categories. Over the course of 25 years, Kelly has won a total of 110 awards from 274 nominations.

American Music Awards
Created by Dick Clark in 1973, the American Music Awards is an annual music awards ceremony, and one of several major annual American music awards shows.

BET Awards
The BET Awards were established in 2001 by the Black Entertainment Television (BET) network to celebrate African Americans and other minorities in music, acting, sports and other fields of entertainment. The awards are presented annually and broadcast live on BET.

Billboard Awards
The Billboard Music Award is an honor that began in 1989 given by Billboard, a publication and music popularity chart covering the music business.

Billboard R&B/Hip Hop Awards

Billboard.com's Readers Poll

Billboard End Of Year Chart Awards
This award is based on U.S. sales and airplay on music. A nomination means that it is in the top five or three that year.

|-
| style="text-align:center;" rowspan="20"|1994
| style="text-align:center;" rowspan="11"|R. Kelly
| style="text-align:center;"|Top Hot 100 Singles Artist - Male
|
|-
| style="text-align:center;"|Top R&B/Hip Artist
|
|-
| style="text-align:center;"|Top R&B/Hip Hop Artist - Male
|
|-
| style="text-align:center;"|Top R&B/Hip Hop Album Artist - Male
|
|-
| style="text-align:center;"|Top R&B/Hip Hop Album Artist 
|
|-
| style="text-align:center;"|Top R&B/Hip Hop Singles Artist - Male
|
|-
| style="text-align:center;"|Top Pop Artist
|
|-
| style="text-align:center;"|Top Billboard 200 Album Artist - Male
|
|-
| style="text-align:center;"|Top Hot Dance Music Maxi-Singles Sales Artist
|
|-
| style="text-align:center;"|Top Singles Artist - Male
|
|-
| style="text-align:center;"|Top Pop Artist - Male
|
|-
| style="text-align:center;"|12 Play
| style="text-align:center;"|Top R&B/Hip Album
|
|-
| style="text-align:center;" rowspan="4"|Bump N' Grind
| style="text-align:center;"|Top Singles Sales
|
|-
| style="text-align:center;"|Top R&B/Hip Hop Singles
|
|-
| style="text-align:center;"|Top R&B/Hip Hop Singles Sales
|
|-
| style="text-align:center;" rowspan="3"|Top R&B/Hip Hop Airplay
|
|-
| style="text-align:center;"|Your Body's Callin'
|
|-
| style="text-align:center;" rowspan="3"|Back And Forth (As songwriter)
|
|-
| style="text-align:center;"|Top R&B/Hip Hop Singles 
|
|-
| style="text-align:center;"|Top R&B/Hip Hop Singles Sales
|
|-
| style="text-align:center;" rowspan="14"|1996
| style="text-align:center;" rowspan="11"|R. Kelly
| style="text-align:center;"|Top Album Artist - Male
|
|-
| style="text-align:center;"|Top Singles Artist - Male
|
|-
| style="text-align:center;"|Top Singles Songwriter - Male
|
|-
| style="text-align:center;"|Top R&B/Hip Hop Artist 
|
|-
| style="text-align:center;"|Top R&B/Hip Hop Artist - Male
|
|-
| style="text-align:center;"|Top R&B/Hip Hop Album Artist 
|
|-
| style="text-align:center;"|Top R&B/Hip Hop Album Artist - Male 
|
|-
| style="text-align:center;"|Top R&B/Hip Hop Singles Artist 
|
|-
| style="text-align:center;"|Top R&B/Hip Hop Singles Artist - Male
|
|-
| style="text-align:center;"|Top R&B/Hip Hop Producers
|
|-
| style="text-align:center;"|Top R&B/Hip Hop Songwriters
|
|-
| style="text-align:center;" rowspan="3"|Down Low (Nobody Has To Know)
| style="text-align:center;"|Top R&B/Hip Hop Singles Sales
|
|-
| style="text-align:center;"|Top R&B/Hip Hop Singles Airplay
|
|-
| style="text-align:center;"|Hot Dance Music Maxi- Singles Sales
|
|-
| style="text-align:center;" rowspan="7"|1997
| style="text-align:center;" rowspan="2"|R. Kelly
| style="text-align:center;"|Top Singles Artist - Male
|
|-
| style="text-align:center;"|Top R&B/Hip Hop Singles Artist - Male
|
|-
| style="text-align:center;" rowspan="3"|I Believe I Can Fly
| style="text-align:center;"|Top Singles Sales
|
|-
| style="text-align:center;"|Top R&B/Hip Hop Singles Sales
|
|-
| style="text-align:center;"|Top Soundtrack Singles
|
|-
| style="text-align:center;" rowspan="2"|G.H.E.T.T.O.U.T. (As songwriter)
| style="text-align:center;"|Top R&B/Hip Singles & Tracks 
|
|-
| style="text-align:center;"|Top R&B/Hip Songs Airplay 
|
|-
| style="text-align:center;" rowspan="18"|1999
| style="text-align:center;" rowspan="12"|R. Kelly
| style="text-align:center;"|Top Pop Artist - Male
|
|-
| style="text-align:center;"|Top Singles Artist - Male
|
|-
| style="text-align:center;"|Top Singles Songwriter
|
|-
| style="text-align:center;"|Top Singles Producer
|
|-
| style="text-align:center;"|Top R&B/Hip Hop Singles Songwriter
|
|-
| style="text-align:center;"|Top R&B/Hip Hop Singles Producer
|
|-
| style="text-align:center;"|Top R&B/Hip Hop Artist 
|
|-
| style="text-align:center;"|Top R&B/Hip Hop Artist - Male
|
|-
| style="text-align:center;"|Top R&B/Hip Hop Album Artist 
|
|-
| style="text-align:center;"|Top R&B/Hip Hop Album Artist - Male
|
|-
| style="text-align:center;"|Top R&B/Hip Hop Singles & Tracks Artist 
|
|-
| style="text-align:center;"|Top R&B/Hip Hop Singles & Tracks Artist - Male 
|
|-
| style="text-align:center;"|I'm Your Angel (With Celine Dion)
| style="text-align:center;"|Top Singles Sales
|
|-
| style="text-align:center;"|R.
| style="text-align:center;"|Top R&B/Hip Hop Album
|
|-
| style="text-align:center;" rowspan="4"|Fortunate (As songwriter)
| style="text-align:center;"|Top R&B/Hip Hop Singles & Tracks
|
|-
| style="text-align:center;"|Top R&B/Hip Hop Singles Sales
|
|-
| style="text-align:center;"|Top R&B/Hip Hop Singles & Tracks Airplay
|
|-
| style="text-align:center;"|Top Soundtrack Singles
|
|-
| style="text-align:center;" rowspan="6"|2001
| style="text-align:center;" rowspan="4"|R. Kelly
| style="text-align:center;"|Top R&B/Hip Hop Artist
|
|-
| style="text-align:center;"|Top R&B/Hip Hop Artist - Male
|
|-
| style="text-align:center;"|Top R&B/Hip Hop Album Artist
|
|-
| style="text-align:center;"|Top R&B/Hip Hop Album Artist - Male
|
|-
| style="text-align:center;"|TP-2.com
| style="text-align:center;"|Top R&B/Hip Hop Album
|
|-
| style="text-align:center;"|Fiesta 
| style="text-align:center;"|Top R&B/Hip Hop Singles & Tracks
|
|-
| style="text-align:center;" rowspan="20"|2003
| style="text-align:center;" rowspan="15"|R. Kelly
| style="text-align:center;"|Top Pop Artist
|
|-
| style="text-align:center;"|Top Pop Artist - Male
|
|-
| style="text-align:center;"|Top Album Artist - Male
|
|-
| style="text-align:center;"|Top Singles Artist
|
|-
| style="text-align:center;"|Top Singles Artist - Male
|
|-
| style="text-align:center;"|Top R&B/Hip Hop Artist
|
|-
| style="text-align:center;"|Top R&B/Hip Hop Artist - Male
|
|-
| style="text-align:center;"|Top R&B/Hip Hop Album Artist
|
|-
| style="text-align:center;"|Top R&B/Hip Hop Album Artist - Male
|
|-
| style="text-align:center;"|Top R&B/Hip Hop Singles & Tracks Artist
|
|-
| style="text-align:center;"|Top R&B/Hip Hop Singles & Tracks Artist - Male
|
|-
| style="text-align:center;"|Top R&B/Hip Hop Producer
|
|-
| style="text-align:center;"|Top R&B/Hip Hop Songwriter
|
|-
| style="text-align:center;"|Top Producer
|
|-
| style="text-align:center;"|Top Songwriter
|
|-
| style="text-align:center;" rowspan="5"|Ignition (Remix)
| style="text-align:center;"|Top Singles & Tracks
|
|-
| style="text-align:center;"|Top Airplay Tracks
|
|-
| style="text-align:center;"|Top R&B/Hip Hop Singles & Track
|
|-
| style="text-align:center;"|Top R&B/Hip Hop Singles Sales
|
|-
| style="text-align:center;"|Top R&B/Hip Hop Airplay
|
|-
| style="text-align:center;" rowspan="6"|2004
| style="text-align:center;" rowspan="6"|R. Kelly
| style="text-align:center;"|Top R&B/Hip Hop Artist
|
|-
| style="text-align:center;"|Top R&B/Hip Hop Artist - Male
|
|-
| style="text-align:center;"|Top R&B/Hip Hop Album Artist
|
|-
| style="text-align:center;"|Top R&B/Hip Hop Album Artist - Male
|
|-
| style="text-align:center;"|Top R&B/Hip Hop Singles & Tracks Artist
|
|-
| style="text-align:center;"|Top R&B/Hip Hop Singles & Tracks Artist - Male
|
|-
| style="text-align:center;"|2005
| style="text-align:center;"|In The Kitchen/Trapped in the Closet
| style="text-align:center;"|Top R&B/Hip Hop Song Sales
|
|}

BMI Awards

BMI Film & TV Awards

BMI Urban Awards
Broadcast Music, Inc. (BMI) is one of three U.S. performing rights organizations, along with ASCAP and SESAC. It collects license fees on behalf of songwriters, composers, and music publishers, and distributes them as royalties to those members whose works have been performed. In 2012, BMI collected $898.7 million in licensing fees and distributed $749.8 million in royalties.

ECHO Awards, Germany

Black Real Awards

Chicago Music Awards

Grammy Awards
The Grammy Awards are awarded annually by the National Academy of Recording Arts and Sciences. Kelly has won three awards from 25 nominations. "Lean On Me" by Kirk Franklin, which features Kelly, has been nominated for three awards, only one is featured; the other two (Song of The Year and Best R&B Song) are for the songwriter Franklin. Other songs that Kelly has worked on, written and that have been nominated for a Grammy are: Best Pop Vocal Performance ("You Are Not Alone"), Best R&B Male Vocalist ("Fortunate" and "When You Call On Me").

|-
| style="text-align:center;"| 1996
| "You Are Not Alone" (Michael Jackson's song)
| Song of the Year
| 
|-
| style="text-align:center;" rowspan="5"| 1998
| rowspan="5"| "I Believe I Can Fly"
| Record of the Year
| 
|-
| Song of the Year
| 
|-
| Best Male R&B Vocal Performance
| 
|-
| Best R&B Song
| 
|-
| Best Song Written for a Motion Picture, Television or Other Visual Media
| 
|-
| style="text-align:center;" rowspan="2"| 1999
| "I'm Your Angel" (with Celine Dion)
| Best Pop Collaboration with Vocals
| 
|-
| "Lean On Me" (with Kirk Franklin, Mary J. Blige, Crystal Lewis, & Bono)
| Best R&B Vocal Performance by a Duo or Group
| 
|-
| style="text-align:center;" rowspan="3"| 2000
| "When a Woman's Fed Up"
| Best Male R&B Vocal Performance
| 
|-
| R.
| Best R&B Album
| 
|-
| "Satisfy You" (with Puff Daddy)
| Best Rap Performance by a Duo or Group
| 
|-
| style="text-align:center;"| 2001
| "I Wish"
| Best Male R&B Vocal Performance
| 
|-
| style="text-align:center;"| 2003
| "The World's Greatest"
| Best Male R&B Vocal Performance
| 
|-
| style="text-align:center;" rowspan="2"| 2004
| "Step in the Name of Love"
| Best Male R&B Vocal Performance
| 
|-
| Chocolate Factory
| Best Contemporary R&B Album
| 
|-
| style="text-align:center;"| 2005
| "Happy People"
| Best Male R&B Vocal Performance
| 
|-
| style="text-align:center;"| 2006
| Trapped in the Closet Chapters 1–12
| Best Long Form Music Video
| 
|-
| style="text-align:center;" rowspan="2"| 2008
| "Same Girl" (with Usher)
| Best R&B Performance by a Duo or Group with Vocals
| 
|-
| Trapped in the Closet Chapters 13–22
| Best Long Form Music Video
| 
|-
| style="text-align:center;" rowspan="2"| 2011
| "When a Woman Loves"
| Best Traditional R&B Vocal Performance
| 
|-
| Untitled
| Best Contemporary R&B Album
| 
|-
| style="text-align:center;" rowspan="2"| 2012
| "Radio Message"
| Best Traditional R&B Performance
| 
|-
| Love Letter
| Best R&B Album
| 
|-
| style="text-align:center;"| 2013
| Write Me Back
| Best R&B Album
| 
|-
| style="text-align:center;"| 2015
| "It's Your World" (with Jennifer Hudson)
| Best R&B Performance
| 
|}

International Dance Music Awards

MOBO Awards
The Music of Black Origin (MOBO) Awards were established in 1996 by Kanya King. They are held annually in the United Kingdom to recognize artists of any race or nationality performing music of black origin.

MTV Awards

MTV Movie Awards

MTV Video Music Awards

MTV Europe Music Awards

MTV Australia Video Music Awards

NAACP Image Awards
The NAACP Image Awards is an award ceremony from the National Association for the Advancement of Colored People.

Soul Train Music Awards
The Soul Train Music Awards is an annual award show aired in national broadcast syndication that honors the best in African American music and entertainment, established in 1987. No other artist has been nominated for more Soul Train awards than Kelly.

The Source Hip Hop Awards

Vibe Awards
In 2013, Kely was named the number one musical genius since 1993 by Vibe.

Blockbuster Entertainment Awards

Stellar Awards

Ozone Awards

Dove Awards

Whudat Music Awards

MuchMusic Video Awards

World Music Awards
The World Music Award is an international awards show founded in 1989, that annually honors recording artists based on worldwide sales figures provided by the International Federation of the Phonographic Industry (IFPI).

Hong Kong Hit Radio Awards

Guinness Book of World Records

Rescinded awards
Rescinded awards due to allegations and convictions of sex trafficking:

2013: Key to the City of Baton Rouge, Louisiana.  Revoked September 30, 2021.

References

Awards
Kelly, R.